William Wallace (February 4, 1820 – August 28, 1887) was a Canadian journalist and political figure. He represented Norfolk South in the House of Commons of Canada from 1872 to 1882 as a Conservative member.

He was born near Galston, Ayrshire, Scotland, the son of John Wallace, and came to Canada around 1840. Wallace settled at Simcoe, Ontario and established a newspaper there, the British Canadian, as well as operating a printing business. He also opened a bookstore and occupied various posts associated with railways. Wallace served on the school board for Simcoe and also served as reeve, mayor and as a member of the council for Norfolk County. In 1852, he married Mary Ann Kent.

He did not run in the 1874 general election but won a by-election later that same year after the election was appealed. Wallace was defeated in 1882.

References 
 
 

1820 births
1887 deaths
Conservative Party of Canada (1867–1942) MPs
Members of the House of Commons of Canada from Ontario
Mayors of places in Ontario
Scottish emigrants to Canada